Sandrine Le Feur (born 18 March 1991) is a French organic farmer and politician of La République En Marche! (LREM) who has been serving as a member of the National Assembly since the 2017 elections, representing the department of Finistère.

Political career
In parliament, Le Feur serves as member of the Committee on Sustainable Development and Spatial Planning. In addition to her committee assignments, she is an alternate member of the Franco-German Parliamentary Assembly.

Political positions
In 2019, Le Feur was one of nine LREM members who voted against her parliamentary group's majority and opposed the French ratification of the European Union’s Comprehensive Economic and Trade Agreement (CETA) with Canada.

In 2020, Le Feur was one of ten LREM members who voted against her parliamentary group's majority and opposed a much discussed security bill drafted by her colleagues Alice Thourot and Jean-Michel Fauvergue that helps, among other measures, curtail the filming of police forces.

See also
 2017 French legislative election

References

1991 births
Living people
Deputies of the 15th National Assembly of the French Fifth Republic
La République En Marche! politicians
21st-century French women politicians
Place of birth missing (living people)
Women members of the National Assembly (France)